Ruben Reiswerg (August 10, 1912 – March 22, 1998) was an American professional basketball player. He played for the Indianapolis Kautskys in the National Basketball League for four games during the 1939–40 season and averaged 0.3 points per game.

His grandson is Matt Reiswerg, a professional soccer player and coach.

References

1912 births
1998 deaths
Amateur Athletic Union men's basketball players
American men's basketball players
Basketball players from Indianapolis
Guards (basketball)
Indianapolis Kautskys players
United States Army personnel of World War II